The Croatian Democratic Union of Bosnia and Herzegovina ( or HDZ BiH) is a Christian democratic, nationalist political party in Bosnia and Herzegovina, representing the Croats of Bosnia and Herzegovina. It is an observer member of the European People's Party (EPP). Its headquarters is in Mostar.

History
The party was formed on 18 August 1990, with the first party convention held in Sarajevo. It has participated in all multiparty elections held in Bosnia and Herzegovina since 1991. It regularly won the support of the Croat electorate up to 2000 and took part in forming the government. It returned to power in 2002, where it remained until 2010. Since 2014, the party has once again been in power.

In the October 2002 general election, the party was part of the "Croatian Coalition" (Hrvatska koalicija) which won 9.5% of the popular vote and five out of 42 seats in the national House of Representatives and 16 out of 98 seats in the Federal House of Representatives.

In 2006, the party joined the Croatian National Assembly, an alliance of Bosnian Croat political parties, along with the Croatian Party of Rights of Bosnia and Herzegovina and the Croat People's Union.

Throughout its history, the HDZ BiH has had nine presidents, the current one being Dragan Čović since 5 June 2005. Four of the six Croat members of the Presidency of Bosnia and Herzegovina have come from the party, the most recent one also being Čović, serving in office from 2014 until 2018.

In the 2018 general election, the party was in a coalition with three other Bosnian Croat parties (Croatian Peasant Party of Bosnia and Herzegovina, Croatian Party of Rights of Bosnia and Herzegovina, Croatian Christian Democratic Union of Bosnia and Herzegovina), winning 149,872 or 9.05% of the votes, five out of 42 seats in the national House of Representatives and 16 out of 98 in the Federal one.

List of presidents

Elections

Parliamentary Assembly of Bosnia and Herzegovina

Presidency elections

Cantonal elections

See also
Croatian Democratic Union

References

External links
 

1990 establishments in Bosnia and Herzegovina
Conservative parties in Bosnia and Herzegovina
Croat political parties in Bosnia and Herzegovina
Croatian Democratic Union
Croatian nationalist parties
History of the Croats of Bosnia and Herzegovina
Political parties established in 1990
Political parties in Bosnia and Herzegovina
Political parties in Yugoslavia
Pro-European political parties in Bosnia and Herzegovina